Reims station (French: Gare de Reims) is the main railway station in the city of Reims, Marne department, northern France.

Since 16 September 2011, the train shed is labelled "20th century heritage".

The station was opened in 1858 by the "Compagnie des chemins de fer des Ardennes".

Services are provided by SNCF under its branded TGV inOui and TER Grand Est network.

Services

TGV inOui
Since the opening of the East European High Speed Line on 10 June 2007, Reims station has benefited from direct TGV toward Paris with a travel time of 45 minutes.

TER Fluo Grand Est
The station is served by several lines as below:
 Reims – Châlons-en-Champagne (Saint-Dizier –  Chaumont – Culmont-Chalindrey and Dijon-Ville)
 Reims –  Épernay (Châlons-en-Champagne – Vitry-le-François – Bar-le-Duc – Toul – Nancy-Ville –  Lunéville on Sunday)
 Reims – Fismes
 Reims – Laon
 Champagne-Ardenne TGV – Reims – Charleville-Mézières –  Sedan.

See also 

 List of SNCF stations in Grand Est

References

External links
 

Railway stations in Marne (department)
Railway stations in France opened in 1858
Transport in Reims
Buildings and structures in Reims